SS William Rockefeller was a tanker ship built in 1921 and named after financier William Rockefeller. At the time of her sinking by a German submarine in 1942, the SS William Rockefeller was one of the world's largest tankers, and she was the largest to be lost off the North Carolina coast.

World War II
The William Rockefeller was going to New York from Aruba through Torpedo Alley on June 28, 1942, carrying over 135,000 barrels of bunker "C" fuel oil, when the U-701 sent a torpedo into her port side amidships. A furious inferno ensued. The 44-member crew and her 6-member Naval Armed Guard abandoned her approximately 15 minutes later. They all survived, being picked up by CG-470 and taken to the Ocracoke Coast Guard Station. The ship burned and drifted for 11 hours, and sank after the U-701 fired another torpedo into her. The U-boat escaped, despite aerial and naval attacks, only to be sunk a week later.

The sinking was reported to have occurred 16 miles ENE of Diamond Shoal Light Buoy but the actual final resting place is unknown.

References
 Article by Paul M. Hudy at www.nc-wreckdiving.com
 http://www.aukevisser.nl/inter/id129.htm

 

World War II shipwrecks in the Atlantic Ocean
Shipwrecks of the Carolina coast
Maritime incidents in June 1942
Ships sunk by German submarines in World War II
1921 ships